Keleswaram  is a small village in Thiruvananthapuram district in the state of Kerala, India. This place is located between Peringammala and Punnamoodu .

Geography

Places Near by Keleswaram
The famous Keleswaram Mahadeva Temple is situated here. The places near by keleswaram are Peringammala, Punnamoodu, Kalliyoor and Balaramapuram. The Government Model Higher Secondary School, Punnamoodu is one of the oldest schools in Thiruvananthapuram District, Kerala, India which is 1 km away from keleswaram . It was established in 1915. Balaramapuram is other famous place 3 km away from keleswaram, known as the centre for the production of traditional varieties of handloom textiles meant for the contemporary cloth wearing style of Kerala. Its unique craftsmanship makes it an ideal heirloom.

Demographics
 India census, Kalliyoor had a population of 36836 with 18176 males and 18660 females.

Religion
The population of Keleswaram mainly practices Hinduism and Christianity.The famous Keleswaram Mahadeva Temple, Raktheshwari devi temple and churches also situated here.

References

 http://www.asklaila.com/listing/Thiruvananthapuram/Punnamoodu/Government+Higher+Secondary+School/0euIfqwD/
 http://www.distancesfrom.com/in/map-from-Nemom-Punnamoodu-Road-to-Trivandrum/MapHistory/4989551.aspx

Villages in Thiruvananthapuram district